is a former Japanese football player. He played for Japan national team.

Club career
Takabayashi was born on November 15, 1953. After graduating from Chuo University, he joined Hitachi in 1976. The club won 1976 JSL Cup. He retired in 1982. He played 79 games and scored 10 goals in the league.

National team career
On February 12, 1974, when Takabayashi was a Chuo University student, he debuted and scored a goal for Japan national team against Singapore. In September, he was selected Japan for 1974 Asian Games. He also played at 1976 Summer Olympics qualification. He played 12 games and scored 2 goals for Japan until 1976.

Club statistics

National team statistics

References

External links
 
 Japan National Football Team Database

1953 births
Living people
Chuo University alumni
Japanese footballers
Japan international footballers
Japan Soccer League players
Kashiwa Reysol players
Footballers at the 1974 Asian Games
Association football forwards
Asian Games competitors for Japan